Viktorija Golubic was the defending champion but chose not to participate.

Irina-Camelia Begu won the title, without losing a set throughout the tournament, defeating Misaki Doi in the final, 6–3, 6–3.

Seeds
All seeds received a bye into the second round.

Draw

Finals

Top half

Section 1

Section 2

Bottom half

Section 3

Section 4

Qualifying

Seeds

Qualifiers

Lucky losers

Draw

First qualifier

Second qualifier

References

External links
Main Draw
Qualifying Draw

2020 WTA 125K series
2020 Women's Singles